The Capture of Stuff Redoubt was a tactical incident during the Battle of the Somme in 1916. The redoubt had been built as part of the fortification of the Somme front by the German 2nd Army ( Fritz von Below) after the open warfare of 1914. On 1 July, the First Day on the Somme, troops of the 36th (Ulster) Division occupied part of the redoubt before being forced out by German counter-attacks. British troops were not able to reach the redoubt again until the Battle of Thiepval Ridge (26–28 September) when parties of the 11th (Northern) Division captured part of the redoubt. The rest of the redoubt was taken by the 25th Division during the Battle of the Ancre Heights (1 October – 11 November).

Some German officers thought that the blow to German morale was worse than news of the fall of Thiepval. The loss of the redoubt and the success of an attack by the British II Corps on Stuff Trench, beyond the redoubt, on 21 October exposed the Ancre valley and Grandcourt to ground observation. The army group commander Crown Prince Rupprecht and Erich Ludendorff the deputy Chief of the General Staff of the German army wanted to retire from the salient that had formed from St Pierre Division and Beaumont Hamel but Below preferred to hold on since the remaining positions were strong and on high ground with good observation. The last big attack by the Reserve Army (renamed Fifth Army on 30 October) the Battle of the Ancre (13–18 November) against these positions was a great success.

Background

Somme front, 1914–1915

The 26th (Württemberg) Reserve Division  Franz von Soden) of the XIV Reserve Corps  Hermann von Stein), arrived on the Somme in late September 1914, attempting to advance westwards towards Amiens. By 7 October, the advance had ended and temporary scrapes had been occupied. Fighting in the area from the Somme north to the Ancre, subsided into minor line-straightening attacks by both sides. The primacy of artillery had been established during the fighting of 1914 and the exploitation of artillery fire power in defensive fighting, required means of communication between the front line and artillery positions in the rear. Artillery organisation needed to be centralised to make sure that all guns in range engaged targets.

In late December 1915, Major Bornemann, commander of the 26th Division field artillery, wrote a report in which he described failures of communication, which led to an advantage created by the blowing of a mine being squandered by the artillery. Bornemann wrote that artillery battery observation posts had been left unmanned, on the assumption that they had been superseded by artillery liaison officers in the front line. Reporting had been inadequate due to complacency and reports should have been circulated to all headquarters rather than individual officers assuming that the information had been communicated. The artillery should avoid settling into routine firing, since prisoners had reported that its predictability made it easy to evade and limiting firing to the area in front of batteries should cease and oblique firing into adjacent sectors begin, to ensure that British artillery could not fire with impunity from the flanks. Concentrations of fire consumed too much ammunition on local targets and should be limited to provide ammunition for firing on other targets to disrupt British operations and to reassure German infantry that they would not be abandoned by the artillery.

Bornemann also wrote that retaliatory fire should be prompt and authority to order fire should be shared by all artillery officers, rather than relying on unreliable communications to request authority to fire on targets as they were observed. As an example, he recommended that if a British artillery battery was detected, it should be engaged with  immediately. Co-operation with artillery observers in aircraft and balloons should be improved, with at least one target selected for bombardment in every aircraft sortie, for which the artillery commanders should make gridded drawings of targets within range. When British aircraft were overhead, battery positions should cease fire to remain hidden and German aircraft units should be contacted to drive the British away. Bornemann suggested that artillery group commanders should have control of all artillery ammunition allotted to the group and that artillery regimental headquarters should be responsible for replacing stocks and passing on demands for more ammunition to higher headquarters.

Somme fortifications, 1915

The trenches were to be traversed and have sentry-posts in concrete recesses built into the parapet. Communication trenches were to be dug back to the reserve position, renamed the second position, which was as well-built and wired as the first line. The second position was built beyond the range of Allied field artillery, to force an attacker to stop and move field artillery forward before assaulting the line.

The Somme defences had two inherent weaknesses which the rebuilding had not remedied. The front trenches were on a forward slope, lined by white chalk from the subsoil and easily seen by ground observers.

1916

Beyond the redoubt was Stuff Trench on the far slope, which led from  Redoubt eastwards to Stuff Redoubt and on to Courcelette. The redoubt was about halfway between Pozières and Grandcourt.

New battery positions were built to accommodate artillery reinforcements, dugouts were deepened and extra exits were added. Engineers sited and designed new trenches and stringently inspected the building work performed by the infantry. In early March 1916 and from  the chief engineer of the 2nd Army inspected the first position in the area of the 26th Reserve Division, who found that only in the area north of the Ancre, were there enough shell-proof concrete posts. By July 1916, the German front line from Thiepval to St Pierre Divion was obstructed by sixteen rows of barbed wire and the second line lay behind five rows.

Prelude

1 July

Morning

At  the 36th (Ulster) Division troops formed up in no man's land and moved to within  of the German front trench. As soon as the British guns stopped, machine-gun fire from Thiepval cemetery caught the third support battalion on the left flank.

Reserve Infantry Regiment 99 (RIR 99) of Reserve Infantry Brigade 52 (General von Auwäter), holding the line north of Thiepval, was broken through and the attackers rushed  Redoubt. The garrison, a support company standing by to reinforce the front defences, was surprised and surrendered after brief resistance. The centre battalion of RIR 99 had been destroyed in the breakthrough and  taken prisoner.

The left hand battalion of RIR 99 had repulsed the attack on Thiepval but the centre and right, from the village to the Ancre south of St Pierre Divion, had been overrun, the troops having been trapped underground and taken prisoner. Observers in the Grandcourt Line were unable to see the breakthrough because of smoke and dust in the air. Only when the British advanced on the Grandcourt Line, was the identity of the troops that could be seen in the area discovered. As soon as the British bombardment lifted, the only reserves nearby, the recruit battalion of IR 180 and a machine-gun company, occupied the Grandcourt Line around Thiepval.

By  runners had reported the fall of the C line but because of the defeats of the 32nd Division on the right flank at Thiepval and the VIII Corps divisions on the north bank of the Ancre, Nugent tried to get permission to cancel the 107th Brigade attack on the D line but was over-ruled, as new attacks were being arranged on the flanks. German counter-attacks on the left flank from St Pierre Divion, were forced back several times by the remaining men of the three battalions on the left flank; on the right flank, Mouquet Switch Trench was reconnoitred and found empty.

By  the breakthrough on the 26th Reserve Division front had made Thiepval vulnerable to an attack from the redoubt, which would make the village untenable. Soden ordered Auwäter to recapture the redoubt and sent a battalion of Bavarian Reserve Infantry Regiment 8 (BRIR 8) in reinforcement. Auwäter ordered the counter-attack to begin immediately by three groups, from the north-east, east and south-east, to forestall an Irish wheeling movement against Thiepval and Ovillers. II Battalion, BRIR 8 (Major Roesch) comprising Group 3 was to attack from Stuff Redoubt but delays caused to message runners and the British bombardment delayed the advance from Irles.

Afternoon
Crews of 4 Squadron Royal Flying Corps (RFC) observed the attack of the 36th Division beyond the German front line, where it was out of view from the British lines. At  an observer reported that German artillery from Grandcourt to Courcelette, was retiring and at  that there was no sign of German troops massing against the redoubt. After an hour, the 36th Division was reported still to be holding The Crucifix, south-east of the redoubt. The rest of the counter-attack force was ordered not to wait and  Bram reached Stuff Redoubt to command the attack during the afternoon, having had to move on foot via Courcelette through the British bombardments. Moving around the redoubt was difficult due to the number of shells that had been fired into the area, tearing up the ground, the maze of trenches and the constant British barrage. Bram found an intact observation post and from it saw British troops just in front of the second position and troops of the 5th Company, BRIR 8 and Machine-Gun Marksman Detachment 89 (M-GMD 89). Groups 1 and 2 were nearly ready to attack but Group 3 was still struggling forward, the 8th Company going astray into the 51st Brigade area. Bram set up headquarters on the steps of a dug out full of wounded but could see little from Stuff Redoubt because of smoke and dust.

The 9th and 10th Company BRIR 8 were to remain in  Redoubt as a defence force and the rest of the men were to assemble around Stuff Redoubt, made most difficult by the constant British artillery-fire. The attack was met by machine-gun fire, bogged down and Bayerköhler was killed. Soden sent more orders to Bram to attack immediately but movement for both sides was extremely difficult and they were cut off from reinforcements. Bram reported at  that the 36th Division was across Auwärter Trench and the Thiepval–Grandcourt road facing east. Orders had been issued but contact had been lost with Group 1, Group 3 was still invisible and no reserves remained to counter-attack  Redoubt. Parties had been sent out to find the I and III battalions of BRIR 8 and reinforcements were requested.

The advance was continued along , which led from Courcelette to Thepval and then moved into the open opposite the south-eastern corner of  Redoubt. The fourth company of the battalion had been intended to move along , so joined the other three companies. By  troops in the original front line near St Pierre Divion, had bombed southwards and recovered some of the captured front line. The advance up the  had reached the north face of the redoubt and then been repulsed.

By  another rush on the south-eastern corner by IR 180 failed and more piecemeal attacks from all round the redoubt were driven off, with many casualties. Messages were sent back to the 26th Division headquarters for a bombardment and at  the divisional artillery began to fire on the redoubt, from the north-east to the south-east for one hour. In costly hand-to-hand fighting, the Germans recaptured the redoubt in about thirty minutes, finding it strewn with about  dead. By midnight the ridge had been re-occupied and two more battalions of IR 180 had arrived and moved to the Hansa Line and the redoubt, available to reinforce the front line from Thiepval to the Ancre.

Troops were sent forward by the 52nd Reserve Infantry Brigade; I Battalion, IR 185 stayed in Stuff Redoubt as a reserve and then took over the second position south of Grandcourt and the II Battalion IR 185 took over from Stuff Redoubt to sector  IV. As II Battalion, BRIR 8 arrived, the troops had been sent forward piecemeal and gradually began to overwhelm the defenders, much assisted by better artillery support, which by  made the Irish hold on  Redoubt untenable. The final attack began an hour later by bombing along trenches against the handful of survivors still able to fight.

British offensive preparations

September

On the right flank of the II Corps (Lieutenant-General Claud Jacob), the 11th (Northern) Division (Lieutenant-General Charles Woollcombe) was to capture Hessian Trench on top of the ridge and Stuff Redoubt; if possible patrols were to be sent forward to take Stuff Trench. The 34th Brigade (Brigadier-General J. Hill) on the right would have to capture Mouquet Farm, advance up the old German second position trenches to Zollern Redoubt and thence to Stuff Redoubt. Two tanks were attached, to move from positions west of Pozières, arrive at Mouquet Farm at zero hour and then drive north onto the second position. On 28 September the Reserve Army issued instructions that Stuff and  redoubts were to be captured by 29 September and Stuff Trench on 1 October.

October
On 30 September on the II Corps front, the 7th Brigade (Brigadier-General C. C. Onslow) and the 75th Brigade (Brigadier-General E. St G. Pratt) relieved the 74th Brigade and the 11th (Northern) Division by 1 October. On the right flank there was observation over the Grandcourt valley but further left the Germans still held the ridge from Stuff Redoubt. At the redoubt, the southern face was held by the British and the northern face by the Germans. Preparations began, amidst rain and mud, for the capture the rest of the redoubt and higher ground just beyond to gain observation over the Grandcourt valley. Communication trenches were dug and deep dugouts excavated for the attacking infantry. The bad weather caused a postponement but the attack was eventually set for 9 October.

Battle

26 September

West of the Canadian Corps, II Corps attacked with the 11th (Northern) and 18th (Eastern) divisions. The 11th Northern Division advanced with the 34th Brigade on the right which attacked with two battalions; a bombing party rushed forward to Mouquet Farm thirty seconds before zero to guard the dugout exits. Both battalions got to their first objective, a line either side of the German second position south of  Redoubt, with few losses. The rear waves were nearly caught by the German counter-barrage but the 5th Dorset, moving up in support to the British front line was hit and had many casualties, including the four company commanders. The leading battalions had a ten-minute pause to clear the trench and send back prisoners; the advance began again into small-arms fire from Hessian Trench,  and Stuff redoubts. The right-hand battalion became bogged down fighting through  Redoubt against IR 93, the attack collapsed and most of the moppers-up were killed. About  dug in on the right facing  Trench, while others found cover in shell-holes to the west of the second position.

The left battalion was caught by machine-gun fire from  Redoubt and Midway Line; the right flank units were almost annihilated. The battalion reached Midway Line, which ran from Mouquet Farm to  Redoubt north of Thiepval, which was defended by six trench mortars. An officer and a few soldiers pressed on to  Trench, the west end of which linked  Redoubt to Thiepval and got a foothold. The Germans in  Redoubt and  Trench had held on with the support of an artillery barrage, until the Canadian Corps advance on their left flank outflanked the position and then the remaining defenders made their way back to Stuff Trench, defined as the new main line of defence, behind the remaining advanced positions. The 5th Dorset had reached High Trench and parties joined up with the survivors of the two attacking battalions. Smoke from the German bombardment reduced visibility and movement in the open had been impossible because of German return fire. Reports arrived before  that the second objective had been captured and after other exaggerated reports, a party of Vickers gunners and part of the 86th Field Company RE were ordered to the north end of Zollern Redoubt to consolidate. The commanders of the two attacking battalions went forward to investigate and found scattered groups of men in an empty battlefield with German machine-gun fire coming from  Redoubt and Mouquet Farm.

Mouquet Farm

The fighting at the farm continued in the rubble, some troops of the 11th Manchester in brigade reserve having relieved the attacking battalion. The two attached tanks had ditched short of the farm but one crew dismounted machine-guns from their tank and joined the attack on foot. A party of the 5th Dorset arrived and troops from the 6th East Yorkshire (Pioneers) were sent forward. At  the last  of the 6th Company, IR 165 (8th Division) surrendered after being attacked with smoke bombs. When dark fell the area was chaotic, little accurate information having reached the brigade and divisional headquarters, where it was believed for a time that the final objective had been reached. While waiting for news, the 5th Dorset was sent forward to consolidate  Redoubt and gain touch with the Canadians on the right. The commander began to assemble the scattered companies just south of the redoubt; by then the 11th Manchester had got three companies into the German front line in Hessian Trench and a little beyond.

27 September
The 11th (Northern) Division sent forward orders to resume the attack at  officer patrols had gone forward to find the location of units but it took until dawn to discover the situation on the 34th Brigade front. At  it had been found that  Redoubt was empty and the survivors of the battalion nearby were eventually collected and withdrawn. On the west side of the redoubt the attacking battalion and some troops from the 5th Dorset got into  Trench up to Midway Line and the 11th Manchester, in the trench on the east side of  Redoubt, linked with the Canadians on the right. The 11th Manchester was to advance and occupy Stuff Redoubt (apparently abandoned by the Germans) and then take Hessian Trench. As soon as it was daylight an extensive German bombardment began and the advance of the 11th Manchester was stopped by machine-gun fire from Stuff Redoubt and Hessian Trench, which turned out to be occupied by three companies of IR 93 two from I Battalion, IR 165 and two from III Battalion, IR 153.

After a noon conference, Woollcombe ordered another attack at  but the 34th Brigade was exhausted and the 32nd Brigade was ordered to send forward from reserve the 9th West Yorkshire and the 6th Green Howards, to continue the attack and clear up the ground as they advanced to Stuff Redoubt and Hessian Trench. The battalions were moving up when orders of a postponement to give more time for preparation were sent forward. The news failed to reach the 9th West Yorkshire, which arrived at the jumping-off line in  Trench on the east side of Stuff Redoubt, just after  and attacked, despite there being no sign of the Green Howards on the left. The British barrage lifted as soon as the advance was noticed and the battalion, which had not seen the ground before, dodged to the left, round the wreckage of shell-holes and mud filled trenches. Despite return fire from the Germans, the troops reached the south side of Stuff Redoubt and gained a footing.

The Green Howards attacked an hour later at the new Zero Hour, without the artillery barrage, which had been fired at the original time. The defenders of Hessian Trench to the west of the redoubt were surprised and captured, a field artillery brigade firing in support of the Howards as soon as they were seen to advance. The Green Howards took  and two machine-guns for minor losses and gained touch with the 33rd Brigade on the left and with the West Yorkshires in the redoubt on the right. Parties from two battalions acted as ammunition carriers and at  the 11th Manchester bombed forward along a trench from  Redoubt, towards the Canadians to the north-east. The 33rd Brigade on the left of the division attacked eastwards during the morning, linked with the 34th Brigade and at  the rest of Hessian Trench was occupied.

28–30 September
The Dukes were delayed by German artillery bombardments and congestion in the trenches and the attack was delayed. Later on a party in Stuff Redoubt bombed forward on the right flank, captured the north side of the Redoubt and gained ground further on but this was later abandoned, when the party ran out of ammunition during German counter-attacks. The 33rd Brigade sent patrols forward towards Stuff Trench, which was found to be full of German troops. IR 153 recorded later that isolated troops were pushed back to Stuff Trench.

On 29 September, the 8th Canadian Brigade, (3rd Canadian Division) attacked at noon with the 32nd Brigade of the 11th (Northern) Division on the left flank. A Stokes mortar bombardment was arranged as well as the usual creeping barrage and three companies of the 6th York and Lancaster reached Hessian Trench, most of which was captured. Touch was gained with the Canadians but a  length of trench on the left, next to Stuff Redoubt, was not captured. The troops still in the redoubt attacked the north side again and almost ejected the last of the garrison before running out of hand grenades. The survivors had to retire to the south face, where they repulsed a German counter-attack in the evening. The British attacks made it impossible for the 8th Division to be relieved until 30 September. The 32nd Brigade had run out of fresh battalions and the 7th South Staffordshire of the 33rd Brigade was sent forward as a reinforcement.

On 30 September, the II Corps resumed its attacks, intended to expel the Germans from their positions in Hessian Trench with converging attacks by 11th (Northern) Division bombers, after a preliminary bombardment. At  a 6th York and Lancaster bombing party advanced west along Hessian Trench, the 7th South Staffordshire attacked up  Trench to the support line of the old German second position and the troops in the south face of Stuff Redoubt attacked again. The attacks gained ground against determined German resistance and by nightfall the division had taken its objectives, except for the north side of the redoubt. Canadian bombers assisted the capture of Hessian Trench and during the night, the 33rd Brigade and the 32nd Brigade began to be replaced by the 25th Division (Major-General Guy Bainbridge).

9–13 October

Stuff Redoubt

At  the 10th Battalion Cheshire Regiment (10th Cheshire) attacked Stuff Redoubt, with D and B companies forward, advancing behind an "intense" barrage, with C Company in support and A Company in reserve. By  captured the north face of the redoubt and pushed advanced posts forward to the north-east and the old second position trenches but failed to reach the Mounds, the final objective on the high ground to the north. The battalion took  from RIR 111 (28th Reserve Division) and counted  dead. Two counter-attacks in the evening were defeated by artillery and machine-gun fire. The 7th Brigade relieved the 10th Cheshire with the 8th Battalion, Loyal North Lancashire Regiment for another attack on 10 October to take the Mounds. The Germans counter-attacked again on 11 October and during the evening of 12 October, a German counter-attack by a  supported by a flame-thrower detachment, managed to re-capture the north-west corner of Stuff Redoubt but was then forced out with many casualties; 13 October was quiet.

The Mounds

On 14 October, the 25th Division attacked the Mounds, north-west of Stuff Redoubt, with the 8th Loyal North Lancs of the 7th Brigade. (German prisoners later said that the preparations had been seen but their commander apparently refused to believe that an attack was imminent and ordered the German bombardment to cease at  The battalion took  of II Battalion, RIR 111 and several machine-guns. Observation over the Grandcourt valley was from all along the ridge was obtained and a line of observation posts was built down the slope.

Air operations
Balloon observers reported  batteries firing in the 24 hours before the attack on 26 September and pinpointed the positions of  The artillery bombarded  positions under the direction of artillery-observation aircraft and a force of about  troops seen near Miraumont was scattered by artillery directed by a 4 Squadron crew. The attack was observed by the crews of 4 Squadron and 7 Squadron RFC who reported that the infantry had hugged the creeping barrage, overrun Mouquet Farm and pressed on to  Redoubt and beyond to Hessian Trench as observation crews took photographs of the area. The IV and V brigades RFC   bombs on German trenches, artillery and infantry billets. The III Brigade attacked the German airfield at Lagnicourt and its 60 Squadron attacked observation balloons with Le Prieur rockets, shot down two in flames and attacked several balloons on the ground with phosphorus bombs and a headquarters at Barastre was bombed by 19 Squadron. Two German aircraft were shot down and four more damaged by RFC offensive patrols but the pilots found that the faster German aircraft often refused battle. A 70 Squadron Sopwith -Strutter of a formation of six aircraft was shot down over Bapaume in a dogfight with six German aircraft.

On 27 September the RFC found many German formations airborne until a downpour began. Another -Strutter of 70 Squadron was lost to a German fighter during an early morning reconnaissance and no German aircraft were shot down. A German balloon lost its mooring and drifted from Bapaume towards Ypres, with the observer trying to surrender to RFC aircraft as they intercepted but it was shot down and the observer taken prisoner. Next day air operations continued but 29 September was washed out. On 30 September,  were taken and crews flying at low altitude over the battlefield studied the condition of the German wire and trenches. The advance of the Reserve Army deprived the Germans of observation to the south and it became more important to deny the Germans opportunities for air observation to compensate. The British Nieuport 16 fighters remained a match for the newer, faster, German aircraft and began to escort bomber formations.

During another attack on Lagnicourt aerodrome, German pilots got airborne and attacked the bombers which led to a dogfight with the escort of Nieuports and FE 2bs; three German fighters were shot down for the loss of an FE. The growing menace of the new German fighters, led to proposals to increase the number of fighter squadrons from four to eight per army. On 21 October, a German counter-attack at  Redoubt was repulsed and a British attack which had been prepared for the afternoon, caught the Germans still recovering and captured its objectives, assisted by contact patrols and artillery observation by 4 and 7 squadrons. The visibility was so good that ten artillery emplacements were destroyed,  damaged and seven ammunition pits exploded. Many of the remaining German artillery batteries were forced to stop firing because of the speed by which they were seen by the British air crews and engaged with counter-battery fire, the British having decided to suppress many batteries rather than destroy a few. Long-range bombing raids were successful and offensive patrols to protect the corps squadrons over the battlefield shot down two German aircraft and drove down

Aftermath

Analysis

In 1938, Wilfrid Miles, the British official historian wrote that the attacks of the Battle of Thiepval Ridge had not completed the capture of the ridge. The British had fought with skill and determination but the ridge was a defensive position of great strength and the German defenders fought with equal persistence. Both sides continued until they were exhausted, in trenches full of mud. More depended on the qualities of individuals in an operation that was not a form of semi-siege warfare. Destructive and creeping bombardments were used but the fighting took place on slopes full of trenches, shell-craters and dugouts, which made it difficult for artillery to fire in close support. Towards the end of the battle, co-ordinated broad front attacks might have had more success. Below considered that the remaining positions south of the Ancre were well fortified and on high ground, giving good observation and should be retained.

The capture of the redoubt was considered by some German officers to be a worse blow to morale than the fall of Thiepval. The 28th Reserve Division positions in the Ancre valley were exposed to British ground observation and made Grandcourt a death trap. The trenches were demolished and movement had to be from shell-hole to shell-hole; it was easy to get lost and blunder into British positions. Ludendorff and Rupprecht considered a retirement from the salient that had formed around St Pierre Division and Beaumont Hamel as the Germans had been pushed off the west end of Bazentin Ridge. Below objected because there were no better positions to retire to and preferred to counter-attack to regain  and the positions nearby. In 2005, Prior and Wilson wrote that the attack on the Mounds succeeded because of detailed preparation, the attacking units being fresh, despite the bad weather and resting battalions being used for digging and carrying. The artillery preparation was considered excellent and the assembly for the attack was so well covered by the bombardment, that the attack was a tactical surprise. The infantry were more experienced, keeping close to the creeping barrage and the German artillery-fire was judged to have been feeble. In 2009, William Philpott wrote that it had taken the Reserve Army/5th Army more than a month to capture the north end of the Thiepval Ridge against a reinvigorated German defence. The advance was costly and the front line had been moved barely  forward.

Casualties

Subsequent operations
From  the Reserve Army concluded the Battle of the Ancre Heights  and fought the Battle of the Ancre , being renamed the Fifth Army on 30 October. The defences Below tried to retain were overrun and during the Battle of the Ancre, from 1 to 18 November, the 1st Army suffered  including .

Notes

Footnotes

References

Further reading

External links

Conflicts in 1916
1916 in France
Battle of the Somme
Battles of the Western Front (World War I)
Battles of World War I involving France
Battles of World War I involving Germany
Battles of World War I involving the United Kingdom